Jan Ali Changezi is the former Minister for Quality Education in the Balochistan, Pakistan Government. He belongs to a lower-middle-class family. Started politics in student life. He belongs to the Pakistan People's Party Parliamentarians. Served as Deputy General Secretary PPP Balochistan from 2011 to 2016.
Presently he is Vice President First Peoples Party Balochistan. 
He can speak and write some languages. English, Urdu, Dari Persian and Pashto.
Countries visited are Afghanistan, Iran, UAE, United States, Norway, Sweden, Denmark, the Netherlands, Belgium, France, Germany, Italy and Spain.
The only Hazara politician in any federal party. The first person who has reached in first category leadership in the province.

See also 
 List of Hazara people
 List of people from Quetta

References 

Living people
1970 births
Hazara politicians
Pakistan People's Party politicians
Politicians from Quetta
Pakistani people of Hazara descent
Balochistan MPAs 2008–2013